Richard Ian Charlesworth AO (born 6 February 1952) is an Australian sports coach and former politician. He played first-class cricket for Western Australia and international field hockey for the Kookaburras (the Australian national team), winning a silver medal at the 1976 Summer Olympics and winning the World Cup in 1986. Charlesworth served as a federal member of parliament from 1983 to 1993, representing the Labor Party. After leaving politics, he was appointed coach of the Hockeyroos (the national women's field hockey team), leading them to Olympic gold medals in 1996 and 2000. Charlesworth later coached the Kookaburras from 2009 to 2014, and has also worked in consulting roles with the New Zealand national cricket team, the Australian Institute of Sport, and the Fremantle Football Club (an Australian football team).

Biography
Born in Subiaco, Western Australia, Charlesworth attended Christ Church Grammar School until he graduated in 1969. In 1976, he completed a medical degree (MB, BS) from the University of Western Australia School of Medicine. In 2002, he received an honorary Doctorate of Science at the University of Western Australia and completed a Bachelor of Arts majoring in philosophy and history also at the University of Western Australia.

His father Lester Charlesworth, a dentist, represented Western Australia in cricket between 1949–1951.

Cricket
In 1969 he captained the Western Australian State under 19 cricket team before going on to play A grade Club cricket for West Perth (1969–1970, 1976–82) and University Cricket Club (1970–76).  He played in 47 first-class matches for Western Australia from 1972 until 1979, making 2,327 runs at an average of 30.22. He was a member of Sheffield Shield winning teams in 1972–73, 1976–77, 1977–78, and was a squad member in the winning season of 1974–75.

Hockey

Player
Charlesworth was coached by Ray House at Christ Church Grammar School, where he was promoted to the school's first XI at an early age. He was a member of the PSA Hockey Cup (now known as the Ray House Hockey Cup) winning teams of 1966–67.

He played in and captained the Western Australia hockey team and the Australia men's field hockey team the Kookaburras. He was selected to represent Australia in five Olympic hockey teams, 1972, 1976, 1980 (captain) (Moscow Olympics were boycotted), 1984 (captain), and 1988, winning Silver at the 1976, Montreal Olympic Games. He was a member of the national team which competed in various other international tournaments including winning the World Hockey Cup in London in 1986 where he was named player of the Tournament. He retired from playing after representing Australia at the 1988 Olympics in Seoul. He played 227 games for his country and scored 85 goals.

Charlesworth was inducted into the Australian Hockey Hall of Fame in 2008, the second person to achieve this award.

In 1980, while playing for The University of Western Australia Hockey Club, Charlesworth also won the Olympian's Medal, an annual award presented to the player judged by umpires to be the fairest and best in men's first division competition in Western Australia. In addition, the female equivalent of this award, the Charlesworth Medal, is named in his honour.

Coach
From 1993 to 2000 he was head coach of the Australian Women's hockey team, the Hockeyroos.  During this time they won the Champion's Trophy in 1993 (Amsterdam), 1995 (Mar del Plata), 1997 (Berlin) and 1999 (Brisbane), the World Hockey Cup in 1994 (Dublin) and 1998 (Netherlands) and were gold medallists in the Atlanta Olympics in 1996 and Sydney Olympics in 2000 and 1998 Commonwealth Games in Kuala Lumpur.

Prior to his appointment as technical adviser to the men's and women's Indian hockey teams, he was the high-performance manager for the New Zealand cricket team. He was selected to act as an advisor to the newly formed hockey selection committee formed by the Indian Olympic Association.

Charlesworth has been a mentor coach to several national team coaches with the Australian Institute of Sport and a performance consultant with the Fremantle Football Club.

In 2009, Charlesworth was appointed coach of the Australian men's national hockey team, the Kookaburras. The team went on to win the 2009 Men's Hockey Champions Trophy in Melbourne, Australia; the 2010 Hockey World Cup in New Delhi, India; the 2010 Men's Hockey Champions Trophy in Mönchengladbach, Germany; the 2010 Commonwealth Games Men's Hockey Gold Medal in Delhi, India and the 2011 Men's Hockey Champions Trophy in Auckland. After coaching the Kookaburras to success at the 2014 Hockey World Cup in Netherlands, he resigned.

Politics
He was elected as the Federal Member for Perth in 1983, representing the Australian Labor Party, and was a Member of Parliament for 10 years until retiring in 1993.

Charlesworth said one reason for retiring from Parliament was that he never became a minister.

Administration
Charlesworth was a member of the Australian Sports Commission Board 1994–97 and Western Australian Institute of Sport Board 1984–1992, 2001–2005.

Books
He has written three books: The Coach – Managing for Success, Staying at the Top and Shakespeare the Coach.

Awards
Western Australian Sportsman of the Year in 1976, 1979 and 1987
Advance Australia Award in 1984
Member of the Order of Australia (AM) in  the 1987 Queen's Birthday Honours
Officer of the Order of Australia (AO) in the 2016 Queen's Birthday Honours
Sport Australia Hall of Fame in 1987
Hockey Australia Hall of Fame 2008
Hall of Champions, WA 1995
West Australian Sports Champions of the Year Award – Coach of the Year 1994–2000
Australian Coaching Council Team Coach of the Year 1994, 1996, 1997,1998,1999,2000
Confederation of Australian Sport Coach of the Year 1996, 1997 and 2000
 Australian Sports Medal 2000
Western Australia Citizen of the Year Award 2001
Western Australian Finalist Australian of the Year 2011
 Australian Institute of Sport Coach of the Year 2010
Inaugural Australian Institute of Sport World's Best Award 2014

References

External links
 
 
 

1952 births
Australian male field hockey players
Australian cricket coaches
Australian field hockey coaches
Living people
Members of the Australian House of Representatives
Members of the Australian House of Representatives for Perth
Members of the Order of Australia
Recipients of the Australian Sports Medal
Olympic field hockey players of Australia
Olympic silver medalists for Australia
University of Western Australia alumni
Western Australia cricketers
Women's field hockey in Australia
People educated at Christ Church Grammar School
Australian sportsperson-politicians
Olympic medalists in field hockey
Field hockey players from Perth, Western Australia
Australian cricketers
Australian Olympic coaches
Field hockey players at the 1972 Summer Olympics
Field hockey players at the 1976 Summer Olympics
Field hockey players at the 1984 Summer Olympics
Field hockey players at the 1988 Summer Olympics
Cricketers from Western Australia
Australian Institute of Sport coaches
Sport Australia Hall of Fame inductees
Australian medical doctors
Australian Labor Party members of the Parliament of Australia
Medalists at the 1976 Summer Olympics
20th-century Australian politicians